The Institute of Asset Management is a UK-based not-for-profit professional body for those involved in acquisition, operation and care of physical assets, especially critical infrastructure. It was instrumental in the development of the international standard ISO 55000 for asset management.

History
The IAM was incorporated on 26 February 2004. It led the production that year of the initial draft document PAS 55, its substantial revision to develop PAS 55:2008 (released in Dec 2008), and contributed to ISO Project Committee 251 between 2010 and 2013 before three international standards (55000/1/2) were launched in London on 5 February 2014. Babcock International and Scottish Water were the first two companies to be independently certified by BSI to the new asset management systems standard ISO 55001.

Function
The IAM aims to advance the science and practice of asset management, by promoting and enabling the generation and application of knowledge, training and good practice, and help individuals become demonstrably competent. The Institute developed endorsement schemes for recommending competent assessors and training providers.

In 2012 the IAM launched the IAM Certificate and IAM Diploma international qualifications. The qualifications were updated in 2019 to meet UK qualifications standards and launched a digital certificate in partnership with Acclaim.

Membership grades 
Membership grade is dependent on the individual member's experience and / or formal qualification, whilst a Corporate Membership is also available.

 Registrant Member (Free)
 Associate Member
 Member (awarded the post-nominal letters MIAM)
 Fellow (awarded the post-nominal letters FIAM)

References

External links
 IAM
 Asset Management Academy

Organisations based in Bristol
Trade associations based in the United Kingdom
Organizations established in 2004
Asset management associations